Black Eyed Sons is a seventh studio album by English rock band the Quireboys, released in 2014.  The album was released with an unplugged live album records in Sweden and a DVD of a performance in London recorded during the Beautiful Curse tour.

Track listing

Black Eyed Sons
All songs written by Guy Griffin and Spike, except where noted.
Troublemaker (Black Eyed Son) 	
What Do Want From Me? 	
Julieanne 	
Double Dealin' 	
Stubborn Kinda Heart 	
Lullaby Of London Town 	
The Messenger 	
You Never Can Tell 	
Mother's Ruin 	
Monte Cassino (Lady Lane) (Written by Guy Griffin, Spike, and Paul Guerin)

Unplugged in Sweden
Don't Bite the Hand That Feeds You 	
There She Goes Again 	
Devil Of A Man 	
Mona Lisa Smiled 	
Roses & Rings 	
Misled 	
Have A Drink With Me 	
Sweet Mary Ann 	
I Don't Love You Anymore 	
7 O'Clock

Beautifully Cursed in London
Black Mariah 	
Too Much Of A Good Thing 	
Misled 	
There She Goes Again 	
Homewreckers & Heartbreakers 	
This Is Rock n Roll 	
Mona Lisa Smiled 	
Diamonds & Dirty Stones 	
27 Years 	
I Don't Love You Anymore 	
Tramps & Thieves 	
Hey You 	
Beautiful Curse 	
Chain Smokin' 	
I Love This Dirty Town 	
7 O'Clock 	
For Cryin' Out Loud 	
Mother Mary 	
Sex Party

Charts

Personnel
 Jonathan "Spike" Gray – lead vocals
 Guy Griffin – lead guitar, rhythm guitar, backing vocals
 Paul Guerin – lead guitar, rhythm guitar, backing vocals
 Keith Weir – keyboards, backing vocals
 Dave McCluskey – drums
 Nick Malling – bass guitar

References

2014 albums
The Quireboys albums